Zhang Shuo ( Pinyin: Zhāng Shuò) is a Chinese professional football player as a striker. He has also played for the Chinese national football team.

Club career
Though Zhang Shuo was born in Beijing he would move to Tianjin to play for the Tianjin Teda youth team. In 2002, he would graduate to the senior team where in his debut season he would play in seven games scoring his first goal. The following season he would establish himself as a first choice regular by playing in 26 league games and scoring 6 goals. He has continued to be a regular striker for Tianjin Teda despite not being the most prolific striker.

As of March 2010, it is reported that Zhang has signed a professional contract with the Indonesian Super League side Persik Kediri.

On 6 July 2010 Zhang signed a one-year deal with the Newcastle Jets for the 2010–2011 Hyundai A-League season. After a less than impressive season, where he failed to regularly make the starting team, he was released.

Zhang returned to China and signed a contract with China League One club Shenzhen Phoenix (later name changed to Guangzhou R&F). He scored 8 goals in 22 appearances as Guangzhou R&F finished second place in the League One and won promotion back to the top flight at the first attempt. On 16 June 2015, Zhang was loaned to China League One side Tianjin Songjiang until 31 December 2015.

On 2 January 2016, Zhang transferred to China League One side Tianjin Quanjian. In March, Zhang was loaned to League Two side Jiangsu Yancheng Dingli until 31 December 2017.

International career
After his performances in 2003 for Tianjin Teda, Zhang Shuo was called up to the senior national team and made his debut in an international friendly against Chile in a 0–0 draw. After several friendlies he was called up to the 2003 East Asian Football Championship squad where he made one appearance in a disappointing tournament for China PR. Nevertheless, Zhang Shuo would still continue to be a regular within the Chinese squad and score his first international goal in an international friendly against Lebanon on 3 July 2004 in a 6–0 thrashing. This was enough for Zhang Shuo to be included in the 2004 AFC Asian Cup squad, however he did not make any appearances in the tournament.

Honours

Club
Tianjin Quanjian F.C.
China League One: 2016

References

External links
 
 

1983 births
Living people
Chinese footballers
Footballers from Beijing
China international footballers
Chinese expatriate footballers
Tianjin Jinmen Tiger F.C. players
Persik Kediri players
Newcastle Jets FC players
Guangzhou City F.C. players
Tianjin Tianhai F.C. players
Expatriate footballers in Indonesia
Chinese expatriate sportspeople in Indonesia
Chinese Super League players
China League One players
A-League Men players
Liga 1 (Indonesia) players
2004 AFC Asian Cup players
Association football forwards